Teva is the Hebrew word for nature ("nature").

Teva may refer to:

Companies
 Teva Footwear, American footwear manufacturer
 Teva Naot, Israeli footwear manufacturer
 Teva Pharmaceuticals, Israeli multinational pharmaceutical company

Organizations
 Teva Learning Center, Jewish  environmental education organization
 The Textile and Clothing Workers' Union, a former trade union in Finland
 World Esperantist Vegetarian Association, abbreviated as "TEVA" from its Esperanto name

People with the given name
 Teva Harrison, Canadian-American writer and artist 
 Teva Victor, sculptor from Bora Bora
 Teva Zaveroni, Tahitian footballer

Other uses
 Téva, French TV channel

See also

 Tevatron